Bowang District is a district of the prefecture-level city of Ma'anshan in Anhui province, China. It was created in September 2012 by splitting off the three towns of Bowang, Danyang, and Xinshi from Dangtu County.

Administrative divisions
Bowang District is divided into three towns: Bowang Town, Danyang Town, and Xinshi Town, which are further divided into 3 neighbourhood committees, 3 communities, and 37 villages.

References

County-level divisions of Anhui
2012 establishments in China
Ma'anshan